is a town located in Tokachi Subprefecture, Hokkaido, Japan.

As of September 2016, the town has an estimated population of 27,310 and a density of 80 persons per km2. The total area is 340.46 km2.

On February 6, 2006, the village of Chūrui (from Hiroo District) was merged into Makubetsu.

Makubetsu is the birthplace of park golf, and as of 2006, has no less than ten individual courses.

Mascots

He is one of the descendants of Naumann's elephants. His charm points are his trunks, his big ears, his long tusks and his lovely eyes. He is assisted by  who is a woodpecker from the local park golf course. They both love to play park golfing and eat lily blubs. Pao-kun is unveiled in 1997 while Kumagera-kun is unveiled in 2006.

Notable people from Makubetsu
Hiromu Arakawa, the author of Fullmetal Alchemist and Silver Spoon
Chisato Fukushima, track and field sprint athlete
Miho Takagi, speed skater
Nana Takagi, speed skater
Fumio Ueda, former mayor of Sapporo
Kohei Yamamoto, mountain biker

References

External links

 Official Website 

 
Towns in Hokkaido